Non-aligned may refer to:
 Non-Aligned Movement, movement of states considering themselves not formally aligned with or against any major power bloc
 Non-belligerent, in a war
 Neutrality (international relations), in a war: more restrictive than non-alignment
 Independent (politician)